Juraj Tomášek (born 6 July 1988) is a Slovak football midfielder who currently plays for FK Spartak Vráble, on loan from FC ViOn Zlaté Moravce.

Career
The midfielder began his career with ŠKP Dúbravka and joined than in summer 2005 in the "juniori" team of SK Slovan Bratislava. He played for Slovan Bratislava between March 2008 and joined than in the youth team of FC ViOn Zlaté Moravce. After eight months with the A-youth of Zlaté Moravce was promoted in January 2009 to the seniorside.

External links 
 Corgoň Liga profile
 Šport.sk profile
 Eurofotbal profile

References

1988 births
Living people
Slovak footballers
Association football midfielders
FC ViOn Zlaté Moravce players
ŠK Senec players
Slovak Super Liga players
ŠK Slovan Bratislava players